Iced coffee is a coffee beverage served cold. It may be prepared either by brewing coffee normally (i.e. carafe, French press, etc.) and then serving it over ice or in cold milk or by brewing the coffee cold. In hot brewing, sweeteners and flavoring may be added before cooling, as they dissolve faster. Iced coffee can also be sweetened with pre-dissolved sugar in water.

Iced coffee is regularly available in most coffee shops. Iced coffee is generally brewed at a higher strength than normal coffee, given that it is diluted by the melting ice. In Australia, "iced coffee" is a common term for packaged coffee-flavored and sweetened milk beverage.

History 
Mazagran, a cold, sweetened coffee beverage that originated in Algeria circa 1840, has been described by locals as "the original iced coffee". It was prepared with coffee syrup and cold water.

Frozen coffee beverages, similar to slush, are documented in the 19th century. Similar is the Italian granita al caffè.

Coffee brewed then chilled with ice, called "iced coffee", appears in menus and recipes in the late 19th century.

Iced coffee was popularized by a marketing campaign of the Joint Coffee Trade Publicity Committee of the United States in 1920. Much later, it was marketed by chain outlets like Burger King, Dunkin' Donuts and Starbucks.

Variations by country

Australia

In Australia, iced coffee may include syrup, cream, cocoa powder or coffee beans. The café style is something like an unblended milkshake, and may be made from espresso coffee or only coffee flavoring, such as that sold commercially since the late 19th century in the form of a syrup, an example of which is Bushells Coffee And Chicory Essence.

The packaged beverage is a different product altogether. In South Australia, Farmers Union Iced Coffee has outsold Coca-Cola and is one of the state's biggest brands. Pauls "Territory's Own" Iced Coffee is popular in the Northern Territory and Norco Real Iced Coffee is big in Northern New South Wales and South East Queensland. Other brands are Breaka, Big M, Brownes Chill, Moove, Masters, Dare, Max, Fleurieu, Rush, Oak and Ice Break.

Canada

In Canada, the popular Tim Hortons coffee chain sells iced cappuccinos known locally as Ice Capps. The chain has also recently introduced traditional iced coffee to its Canadian menu in addition to its U.S. menu.  Other fast-food and beverage chains also provide iced coffee. A June 2016 study by research firm NPD found that the popularity of iced coffee drinks had increased by about 16 percent over the same period a year earlier.

Chile
In Chile, iced coffee is called  (iced coffee). It is very popular in the summertime.  is composed of espresso, or coffee powder. Ice cream is added to the coffee as well as sugary additives such as vanilla, cinnamon, or dulce de leche. Iced coffee is enjoyed during the summer time at breakfast and at parties. Atop of Chilean iced coffee may also be whipped cream, and chopped nuts.

Germany

It consists of filtered, hot brewed and cooled coffee with vanilla ice cream and whipped cream on top. However, this type of iced coffee is rarely available in German supermarkets. The most widespread form of iced coffee in supermarkets is a canned version from a variety of brands with different flavours such as Cappuccino and Espresso. This iced coffee is very similar to the canned iced coffee in the UK and in the case of some brands (particularly Nestlé) actually the same product.

Greece

In Greece, a popular iced coffee beverage is frappé, made of instant coffee (generally Nescafe), water, and optionally, sugar using either an electric mixer or a shaker to create foam. Ice cubes and, optionally, milk are added. Frappés became known outside of Greece as a result of the 2004 Summer Olympics in Athens. Frappés have become very popular in Cyprus and Romania.

Italy
In Italy, the Nestlé company introduced Frappé coffee under its Nescafé Red Cup line, with the name Red Cup Iced Coffee.  Many Italian coffee bars serve "caffè freddo", which is straight espresso kept in a freezer and served as icy slush. In the Salento region of Apulia, this was perfected by brewing the espresso freshly, adding the desired amount of sugar or almond milk and finally pouring it into a whiskey glass filled with ice cubes right before being served, known as Caffè in ghiaccio, or coffee in ice. Affogato (espresso poured over a scoop of vanilla gelato or ice cream) is also served, typically as a dessert.

Japan
In Japan,  has been drunk since Taishō period (around the 1920s) in coffeehouses. It is served with gum syrup and milk. Cold tea was already popular, so it was natural to drink cold coffee. In 1969, UCC Ueshima Coffee released canned coffee, which made coffee available everywhere. Today, canned liquid coffee is consumed both cold and hot.

New Zealand 
In New Zealand, iced coffee is popular and served in a number of cafes. It is often served with vanilla icecream or whipped cream.

Thailand

Thai iced coffee is  brewed using strong black coffee, sweetened with sugar, heavy cream (or half-and-half) and cardamom, and quickly cooled and served over ice. Some variations are brewed using espresso.  Thai iced coffee can be served with whipped cream on top for a layered effect and garnished with cinnamon, vanilla or anise. It is a common menu item at Thai restaurants.

United States

Iced coffee is prepared many different ways in the U.S., including cold-brew coffee and chilled conventional coffee.

Iced coffee can be made from cold-brew coffee, for which coffee grounds are soaked for several hours and then strained. The next day, the grounds would be filtered out. The result was a very strong coffee concentrate that was mixed with milk and sweetened.

Many coffee retailers simply use hot-brewed coffee in their iced coffee drinks. Starbucks specifically uses the double-strength method in which the coffee is brewed hot with twice the amount of grounds. With this method, the melted ice does not dilute the strength and flavour of the coffee. Unlike the cold-brew process, this method does not eliminate the acidity inherent in hot-brewed coffee.

See also

 Café liégeois
 List of coffee drinks
 Mazagran (coffee beverage)

References

Coffee drinks
Cold drinks
Coffee